Rabbi Jacob of Chinon also known as Rav Tam of Chinon (Hebrew: רב יעקב מקינון; -1260) was a 13th-century French Tosafist from Chinon. He was a pupil of Isaac ben Abraham of Dampierre and a teacher of Perez of Corbeil. Mordechai ben Hillel mentions that Jacob wrote "Shitṭah", a commentary on the Talmudic tractate, Sanhedrin. Besides that Rabbi Jacob is known for several of his tosafot.

References 

13th-century French rabbis
Tosafists
1190 births

1260 deaths

Year of birth uncertain